

Aero Resources was established at Gardena, California in 1970 to manufacture Drago Jovanovich's J-2 autogyro. It offered an improved version of the aircraft as the Super J-2 (modifying the last examples off the McCulloch production line to this standard), but was unable to obtain enough orders to make production viable.

References

 
 

1970 establishments in California
Defunct aircraft manufacturers of the United States
Companies based in Los Angeles County, California